Javornik Ski Resort is a Slovenian ski resort located at Lome, črni vrh nad Idrijo in municipality of Idrija which is also the closest town. It is 55 km away from Ljubljana.

It is a family ski resort, which has 7 km of ski slopes, 13,5 km of cross-skiing slopes and Snow park.

Resort statistics
Elevation
Summit - 1220 m / (4,001)
Base - 800 m / (2,624 ft)

Ski Terrain
0,3 km2 (74 acres) - covering  of ski slopes on one mountain.

Slope Difficulty
expert (1,5 km)
intermediate (2,5 km)
beginner (3 km)

Vertical Drop
- 458 m - (1,377 ft) in total

Longest Run: "Javornik" 

Average Winter Daytime Temperature: 

Average Annual Snowfall: 

Lift Capacity: 2,000 skiers per hour (all together)

Ski Season Opens: December

Ski Season Ends: March 

Snow Conditions Phone Line: +386 0 (5) 3777544

Other activities
mountain biking
hiking
cross-country skiing (13,5 km)
Snow park (200m)
horse riding
sledding course
bike park

Ski lifts

External links
 ski-javornik.si - official site

Ski areas and resorts in Slovenia